Sohail Fazal (born November 11, 1967, Lahore, Punjab) is a former Pakistani cricketer who played two ODIs in 1989. He is one of the few Christians to have played for Pakistan.

References

1967 births
Living people
Cricketers from Lahore
Pakistani cricketers
Pakistan One Day International cricketers
Pakistani Christians